is the second album by the Hello! Project girl group Tanpopo. It was released September 4, 2002 with the catalog number EPCE-5177. The limited edition contained a booklet with three different covers. The album peaked at #4 on the weekly Oricon chart and charted for five weeks, selling 75,670 copies in its first charting week.

This album contains the A-sides to all seven of the singles that Tanpopo had released at the time (their final single was released three weeks later). It also includes three B-sides, one song from their previous album, an updated version of their debut A-side, and one new song.

Track listing

References

External links 
  entry on the Hello! Project official website
 All of Tanpopo Up-Front Works

2002 albums
Tanpopo albums